The Air Force Security Forces Center (AFSFC) organizes, trains, and equips Air Force security forces worldwide. It develops force protection doctrine, programs, and policies by planning and programming resources to execute the missions of nuclear and non-nuclear weapon system security, physical security, integrated defense, combat arms, law enforcement, anti-terrorism, resource protection, and corrections. It identifies and delivers emergent and future force protection and force application solutions through modeling and simulation. It acts as the executive agency for the Department of Defense military working dog program.

See also
 United States Air Force Security Forces
 Air Force Security Forces Center Web Page

References

Notes

Bibliography

 Air Force Historical Research Center AFSFC Page

Security Forces Center
Centers of the United States Air Force
Military in Texas